Sandbar Sinister, first published in 1934, is a detective story by Phoebe Atwood Taylor which features her series detective Asey Mayo, the "Codfish Sherlock".  This novel is a mystery of the type known as a whodunnit.

Plot summary

The picturesque village of East Pochet in Cape Cod is not its usual self when Elizabeth Colton drives into it; the previous evening, a bootlegger dumped two hundred cases of liquor offshore, and the whole town reaped the windfall.  At some point during the boozy celebrations, however, a bearded mystery writer ended up dead in the boat house at the Sandbar estate.  Asey Mayo must figure out the comings and goings of a number of interested parties before he puts together the meaning of a mysterious fire in the living room and a tube of salve and solves the crime.

1934 American novels
Novels by Phoebe Atwood Taylor
Novels set on Cape Cod and the Islands
W. W. Norton & Company books